Nansen Ice Sheet, or Nansen Ice Shelf, is a  by  ice shelf. It is nourished by the Priestley and Reeves Glaciers and abutting the north side of the Drygalski Ice Tongue, along the coast of Victoria Land, Antarctica. This feature was explored by the South Magnetic Polar Party of the British Antarctic Expedition, 1907-09 and by the Northern Party of the British Antarctic Expedition, 1910-13. Frank Debenham, geologist with the latter expedition, applied the name Nansen Sheet as the feature is adjacent to Mount Nansen, the dominating summit in the area.

See also
 Ice shelves of Antarctica

References

External links
Flow pattern and rheology of marine ice from Nansen Ice Shelf
Compression experiments
NASA Scientists Bury GPS in Antarctic Ice to Measure Effects of Tides (August 2017)

Ice shelves of Antarctica
Glaciers of Victoria Land
Scott Coast